Second class generally indicates a secondary level of service or importance. More specific, it may refer to:

 Economy class, in transport
 Travel class, in  transport
 Second Class, a rank in Boy Scouts of America
 Second-class citizen
 2.-class torpedo boat, Scandinavian ships
 Second class honours, ranking second in a hierarchy of honours
 Second class, a subdivision of military ranks

See also